The city of Savannah, Georgia, the largest city and the county seat of Chatham County, Georgia, is the birthplace and home of several notable individuals. This is a list of people from Savannah, Georgia, and includes people that were born or lived in Savannah, Georgia, for a nontrivial amount of time. Individuals included in this listing are people presumed to be notable because they have received significant coverage in reliable sources that are independent of the subject.

Savannah was established in 1733 and was the first colonial and state capital of Georgia. It is known as America's first planned city and attracts millions of visitors who enjoy the city's architecture and historic structures such as the birthplace of Juliette Gordon Low (founder of the Girl Scouts of the United States of America), the Telfair Academy of Arts and Sciences (one of the South's first public museums),  the First African Baptist Church (one of the oldest black Baptist congregations in the United States), Temple Mickve Israel (the third oldest synagogue in America), and the Central of Georgia Railway roundhouse complex (the oldest standing antebellum rail facility in America). Today, Savannah's downtown area is one of the largest National Historic Landmark Districts in the United States (designated in 1966).

Savannah natives

Athletes

Jordan McRae (born 1991), basketball player for Hapoel Tel Aviv of the Israeli Basketball Premier League

Business people

Judicial

Military

Musicians

Politicians

Scientists and inventors

Writers

Others

Current notable residents (non-natives)

Former notable residents (non-natives)

See also

 Dorothy Barnes Pelote Bridge
 Earl T. Shinhoster Interchange
 List of mayors of Savannah, Georgia

Notes

References

 
Savannah, Georgia
Savannah